Ekerekeme Agiomor (born 16 December 1994) is a Nigerian freestyle wrestler. He is a four-time medalist at the African Wrestling Championships.

Career 

He won the gold medal in the 79 kg event at the 2018 African Wrestling Championships held in Port Harcourt, Nigeria. A year later, he won one of the bronze medals in this event at the 2019 African Wrestling Championships held in Hammamet, Tunisia.

In 2020, he won one of the bronze medals in the 86 kg event at the African Wrestling Championships held in Algiers, Algeria.

He qualified at the 2021 African & Oceania Wrestling Olympic Qualification Tournament to represent Nigeria at the 2020 Summer Olympics in Tokyo, Japan. He competed in the men's 86 kg event.

He won one of the bronze medals in his event at the 2022 African Wrestling Championships held in El Jadida, Morocco. He competed in the men's 86 kg event at the 2022 Commonwealth Games held in Birmingham, England.

Major results

References

External links 
 
 
 

1994 births
Living people
Place of birth missing (living people)
Nigerian male sport wrestlers
African Wrestling Championships medalists
Wrestlers at the 2020 Summer Olympics
Olympic wrestlers of Nigeria
Wrestlers at the 2022 Commonwealth Games
Commonwealth Games competitors for Nigeria
21st-century Nigerian people